Oust is a commune in the Ariège department in southwestern France.

Population
Inhabitants of Oust are called Oustois.

Sights
 The Château de Mirabat, a medieval castle, known to be in ruins in the 14th century, is in the communes of Seix, Oust and Ustou.

See also
Communes of the Ariège department

References

Communes of Ariège (department)
Ariège communes articles needing translation from French Wikipedia